Pelican Narrows is a northern village in the boreal forest of central Saskatchewan, Canada. Its name in Cree is Opawikoscikan which means "The Narrows of Fear".

The community is northwest of the narrows that join Mirond and Pelican Lakes, which lie between the Sturgeon-Weir and Churchill River systems. Pelican Narrows is the administrative headquarters for the Peter Ballantyne Cree Nation, a member of the Prince Albert Grand Council, and the majority of the townsite is reserve land. The community consists of the Northern Village of Pelican Narrows and Pelican Narrows 184B and 206 Indian Reserve. Together they formed a population centre of 3,500 people in 2021.

History 
The Cree settlement dates from at least 1730. It was an area of trade for the Hudson's Bay and North West companies.  In 1874, the Hudson's Bay Company established a permanent post at Pelican Narrows. This became a Northern Store in 1987 which remains open to this day. 

Roman Catholic missionaries were traversing the area from the mid-19th century and established a permanent mission in 1878. Anglican missionaries arrived in the late 1890s and built a church in 1911. Schoolchildren were sent away for a number of years. 

In 1967, an all-weather road was built into the community and other services followed.

Demographics 

Pelican Narrows (population centre) with a population of 2,703 consists of the Northern Village of Pelican Narrows with 790 people and Pelican Narrows 184B Indian Reserve of the Peter Ballantyne Cree Nation with 1,913 people.

2,460 people identified Cree as their mother tongue in 2011.

Infrastructure 

Napoleon Merasty Memorial Arena features an ice rink and a fitness centre. 
Angelique Canada Health Center

Events 

An annual walleye fishing derby takes place every year in July.
From December to February, an Annual Winter Festival takes place across the reserve.

Education 

Schools include the Wapanacak Elementary School and the Wapawikoscikan School (Opawikoscikan Community School) which is home of the Tawowikamik Public Library.

History 

Bitter Embrace: White Society’s Assault on the Woodland Cree is a history of the Pelican Narrows region including interviews with local residents.

See also 

 List of population centres in Saskatchewan
 List of villages in Saskatchewan

References 

Division No. 18, Saskatchewan
Hudson's Bay Company trading posts
Northern villages in Saskatchewan
Peter Ballantyne Cree Nation